Nicholas Bennett (born 15 November 2003) is a Canadian Paralympic swimmer who competes in international level events.

Career
Diagnosed autistic, Bennett first attracted major notice by becoming a triple champion at the 2019 Parapan American Games in Lima, Peru. After winning two silver medals at the 2022 World Para Swimming Championships, Bennett was part of Canadian team for the 2022 Commonwealth Games in Birmingham, and won gold in the 200 m freestyle S14. He said he was "just ecstatic" with the result.

References

External links
 
 

2003 births
Living people
People from Parksville, British Columbia
Paralympic swimmers of Canada
Sportspeople from British Columbia
Medalists at the 2019 Parapan American Games
Medalists at the World Para Swimming Championships
Sportspeople with autism
Swimmers at the 2020 Summer Paralympics
S14-classified Paralympic swimmers
Swimmers at the 2022 Commonwealth Games
Commonwealth Games medallists in swimming
Commonwealth Games gold medallists for Canada
Medallists at the 2022 Commonwealth Games